is a Japanese video game designer working for Nintendo. He was involved as a level designer in the development of numerous games in the Super Mario and The Legend of Zelda series. Speaking about his work on the action-adventure The Legend of Zelda: Link's Awakening, he specified his contributions as the conception of routes, the placement of enemies and the creation of environments. Yamamura's level design philosophy takes into account experienced players skipping areas, with him stressing "the importance of omission and its effects". A regular visitor of amusement arcades, he collects used circuit boards. He is also referred to by the nickname . In 2006, his work on the map and level design of New Super Mario Bros. was nominated for the National Academy of Video Game Trade Reviewers Award in the category "Game Design". The pigeon character Yamamura that debuted in the platform game Super Mario Maker is named after Yasuhisa Yamamura.

Works

References

External links
 

1964 births
20th-century Japanese artists
21st-century Japanese artists
Japanese video game designers
Japanese video game directors
Living people
Nintendo people
Video game artists